Joaquina is a feminine Spanish given name. Notable people with the name include:

Joaquina Cabrera, mother of Guatemalan president Manuel Estrada Cabrera
Joaquina Costa (born 1967), Spanish sprint canoeist
Joaquina Kalukango, American actor
Joaquina Maria Mercedes Barcelo Pages (1857–1940), Spanish nun, cofounder of the Augustinian Sisters of Our Lady of Consolation
Joaquina Téllez-Girón, Marquise of Santa Cruz, daughter of Pedro Téllez-Girón, 9th Duke of Osuna
Joaquina Vedruna de Mas (1783–1854), Spanish nun, founder of the Carmelite Sisters of the Charity

See also
Carlota Joaquina – Princesa do Brasil, 1995 Brazilian comedy film directed and written by Carla Camurati

Spanish feminine given names